HMAS Bathurst (J158), named for the city of Bathurst, New South Wales, was the lead ship of 60 Bathurst-class corvettes constructed during World War II and one of 20 built for the Admiralty but manned by personnel of and commissioned into the Royal Australian Navy (RAN). Constructed during 1940, the ship spent most of her early career operating with the British Eastern Fleet in the Indian Ocean. She returned to Australian waters in late 1944, then was deployed to New Guinea in 1945, but saw little action. Bathurst was paid off in 1946, and sold to a Sydney scrap merchant in 1948.

Design and construction

In 1938, the Australian Commonwealth Naval Board (ACNB) identified the need for a general purpose 'local defence vessel' capable of both anti-submarine and mine-warfare duties, while easy to construct and operate. Construction of the prototype  did not go ahead, but the plans were retained. The need for locally built 'all-rounder' vessels at the start of World War II saw the "Australian Minesweepers" (designated as such to hide their anti-submarine capability, but popularly referred to as "corvettes") approved in September 1939, with 60 constructed during the course of the war: 36 ordered by the RAN, 20 (including Bathurst) ordered by the British Admiralty but manned and commissioned as RAN vessels, and 4 for the Royal Indian Navy.

Bathurst laid down by Cockatoo Island Dockyard in Sydney on 10 February 1940. She was launched on 1 August 1940 by the wife of the dockyard's Engineer Manager, and commissioned on 6 December 1940 under Lieut-Commander A. V. Bunyan, DSC, RD; RANR(S).

Operational history
Bathurst began her career in January 1941 as part of the 21st Minesweeping Flotilla, operating off Australia's east coast. Between March and May, she was assigned as a patrol and escort vessel to Singapore, before proceeding to Colombo and joining the British Eastern Fleet. Bathurst spent the month of June patrolling the Red Sea, then was deployed for three and a half months as a blockade vessel in the Gulf of Tadjoura. During this time, the corvette captured at least three small vessels.

Bathurst returned to Colombo in December, and was used as a patrol vessel and escort between the Indian and African coasts until August 1944. She underwent refit in Colombo from September to November 1943, and was a key component in the rescue and salvage operation following the explosion of two munitions ships at Bombay on 14 April 1944. On 7 August 1944, Bathurst sailed for Fremantle, and performed anti-submarine patrols along the western coast of Australia until April 1945. She was then deployed to New Guinea, but the Allied successes of the Pacific War meant that the remainder of World War II consisted of routine patrols. Two battle honours recognise the ship's wartime service: "Indian Ocean 1942–44" and "Pacific 1945".

Following the conclusion of the war in August 1945, Bathurst was again assigned to the 21st Minesweeping Flotilla, and carried out minesweeping operations in the Hong Kong area.

Decommissioning and fate
Bathurst returned to Sydney on 9 November 1945, and was decommissioned into reserve on 27 September 1946. She was sold for scrap to T. Carr and Co of Sydney on 21 June 1948.

Citations

References
Books

 
Journal and news articles

External links

Bathurst-class corvettes of the Royal Australian Navy
Ships built in New South Wales
1940 ships
World War II corvettes of Australia